Shivashan may refer to:
 Shivashan, Sardasht
 Shivashan, Vazineh, Sardasht County